The 2011–12 EHF Cup was the 31st edition of the competition. Lada Togliatti defeated HC Zalău in the final to win its second international title after the 2002 Cup Winners' Cup.

Qualifying rounds

Round 2

Round 3

Last 16

Quarter-finals

Semifinals

Final

Top goalscorers

References

Women's EHF Cup
2011 in women's handball
2012 in women's handball